Honey is the second studio album by American singer-songwriter Samia. It was released on January 27, 2023, via Grand Jury Music. It serves as the follow-up to her debut album The Baby (2020).

Conception 
During her interview with BrooklynVegan, when asked about her album, Samia said that: "This record is about learning to see the love around you" and also stated that "Sometimes the only thing I can be certain of is the way it feels. Even when I zoom all the way out, the little things matter the most. I was trying to imagine looking back at the end of life and what I'd have to say about it right now. This is a little bit of it. Telling stories, making amends, trying to show people I love them. It's a community record."

Singles 
"Kill Her Freak Out" was released as the album's lead single on September 27, 2022. Music video for the single was released on the same day. "Mad at Me" was released on November 1, 2022 as the second single from the album. "Pink Balloon" and "Sea Lions" were released as a double single on December 6, 2022 as the album's third and fifth track, respectively. Another double single "Breathing Song" and "Honey" was released three days before the album.

Critical reception 

Honey has received universal acclaim from music critics. At Metacritic, which assigns a normalised rating out of 100 to reviews from mainstream critics, the album has an average score of 81 based on 12 reviews. Aggregator AnyDecentMusic?  gave it 7.8 out of 10, based on their assessment of the critical consensus. AllMusic's Marcy Donelson said "Whether autobiographical or a thought exercise, 'Honey' is evocative and often relatable, if in turn inevitably alienating and mercurial." Elly Watson from DIY stated that "Honey is a bright and inviting pop album that brilliantly captures the emotional snapshots of life." Writing for Exclaim! Luke Pearson writes that "Honey  takes a traditional, southern-tinged folk foundation and successfully ventures out in various modern directions, allowing her [Samia] adroit lyricism to occupy a variety of spaces." Gigwise writer Lucy Harbron sees Samia as her "lyricism rings through as the top level of every track" and adding that "Samia's finest moments on Honey take you completely by surprise."

Track listing 
All tracks are produced by Caleb Wright, except "Mad at Me" by Wright and Rostam Batmanglij.

Personnel 
Samia Finnerty – vocals
Caleb Wright – production
Rostam Batmanglij – co–production on "Mad at Me"
Alli Blois – engineer
Christian Lee Hutson – guitar, piano, vocals
Jon Lindquist – drums
Sam Rosenstone – keys and piano
Joey Hays – drums
Megan Mahoney – bass
Mitchell Seymour – synth, piano, bass
Dawson Freeman – guitar, vocals
Cameron Schmidt – guitar
Brenna Kassis – vocals
Hannah Cole – vocals
Papa Mbye – vocals
Briston Maroney – vocals
Jake Luppen – vocals
Raffaella Meloni – vocals
Sophia Matinazad and Jacqueline Justice – photography
Sophia Matinazad – creative design
Max Taeuschel – LP design

References

2023 albums
Samia (musician) albums